This is a complete list of genera in the fish family Gobiidae, in accordance to the 5th edition of Fishes of the World.

List

 Aboma
 Acentrogobius
 Afurcagobius
 Aioliops
 Akko
 Amblyeleotris
 Amblygobius
 Amoya	
 Anatirostrum
 Ancistrogobius
 Antilligobius
 Aphia
 Arcygobius
 Arenigobius
 Aruma
 Asterropteryx
 Aulopareia
 Austrolethops
 Babka
 Barbulifer
 Barbuligobius
 Bathygobius
 Benthophiloides
 Benthophilus
 Bollmannia
 Bryaninops
 Buenia
 Cabillus
 Caffrogobius
 Callogobius
 Caspiosoma
 Chriolepis
 Chromogobius
 Cerdale
 Clarkichthys
 Corcyrogobius
 Coryogalops
 Coryphopterus
 Cristatogobius
 Croilia
 Cryptocentroides
 Cryptocentrus
 Crystallogobius
 Cryptopsilotris
 Ctenogobiops
 Deltentosteus
 Didogobius
 Discordipinna
 Dotsugobius
 Drombus
 Ebomegobius
 Echinogobius
 Economidichthys
 Egglestonichthys
 Ego
 Elacatinus
 Eleotrica
 Evermannia
 Eviota
 Exyrias
 Favonigobius
 Feia
 Fusigobius
 Gammogobius
 Ginsburgellus
 Gladiogobius
 Glossogobius
 Gobiodon
 Gobiopsis
 Gobiosoma
 Gobitrichinotus
 Gobius
 Gobiusculus
 Gobulus
 Gorogobius
 Grallenia
 Gunnellichthys
 Gymneleotris
 Hazeus
 Hetereleotris
 Heterogobius
 Heteroplopomus
 Hyrcanogobius
 Istigobius
 Kelloggella
 Knipowitschia
 Koumansetta
 Kraemeria
 Larsonella
 Lebetus
 Lesueurigobius
 Lobulogobius
 Lophiogobius
 Lophogobius
 Lotilia
 Lubricogobius
 Luposicya
 Lythrypnus
 Macrodontogobius
 Mahidolia
 Mangarinus
 Mauligobius
 Mesogobius
 Microdesmus
 Microgobius
 Minysicya
 Myersina
 Navigobius
 Nemateleotris
 Nematogobius
 Neogobius
 Nes 
 Nesogobius
 Obliquogobius
 Odondebuenia
 Ophiogobius
 Oplopomops
 Oplopomus
 Opua
 Oxymetopon
 Padogobius
 Palatogobius
 Palutrus
 Parachaeturichthys
 Paragunnellichthys
 Paragobiodon
 Paratrimma
 Pariah
 Parioglossus
 Parkraemeria
 Parrella
 Pascua
 Phoxacromion
 Phyllogobius
 Platygobiopsis 
 Pleurosicya
 Polyspondylogobius
 Pomatoschistus
 Ponticola
 Porogobius
 Priolepis
 Proterorhinus
 Psammogobius
 Pseudaphya
 Psilogobius
 Psilotris
 Ptereleotris
 Pterocerdale
 Pycnomma
 Rhinogobiops
 Risor
 Robinsichthys
 Schindleria
 Signigobius
 Silhouettea
 Siphonogobius
 Speleogobius
 Stonogobiops
 Sueviota
 Sufflogobius
 Thorogobius
 Tigrigobius
 Tomiyamichthys
 Trimma
 Trimmatom
 Tryssogobius
 Valenciennea
 Vanderhorstia
 Vanneaugobius
 Varicus
 Vomerogobius	
 Wheelerigobius
 Yoga
 Yongeichthys
 Zagadkogobius
 Zebrus
 Zosterisessor

Timeline

References 

 

.
Ray-finned fish genera
Gobiidae
Gobiidae